The 2022 Call 811 Before You Dig 250 powered by Call811.com was the eighth stock car race of the 2022 NASCAR Xfinity Series, the 15th iteration of the event, and the second race of the Dash 4 Cash. The race was held on Friday, April 8, 2022, in Ridgeway, Virginia at Martinsville Speedway, a 0.526 mile (0.847 km) permanent paperclip-shaped short track. The Dash 4 Cash in this race was consisted of Ty Gibbs, A. J. Allmendinger, Riley Herbst, and Sam Mayer, since they were the highest finishing Xfinity regulars after Richmond Raceway. The race was extended from 250 laps to 261 laps, due to several NASCAR overtime restarts. Brandon Jones of Joe Gibbs Racing would win the race, after moving his teammate, Ty Gibbs, on the final restart. This was Jones' fifth career Xfinity Series win, and his first since 2020. To fill out the podium, Landon Cassill and A. J. Allmendinger of Kaulig Racing would finish 2nd and 3rd, respectively. Allmendinger was also able to win the Dash 4 Cash after finishing ahead of Gibbs, Herbst, and Mayer.

A post-race fight occurred after the race, between Ty Gibbs and Sam Mayer. On the last lap, Gibbs and Jones were battling for the lead, when Mayer and Landon Cassill both attempted to go around Gibbs on the inside line, and resulted with a three wide situation. Mayer's car would get loose, causing him to move up the racetrack, and putting Gibbs into the outside wall. Mayer and Gibbs would end up finishing 5th and 8th, respectively.

Background 
Martinsville Speedway is an NASCAR-owned stock car racing track located in Henry County, in Ridgeway, Virginia, just to the south of Martinsville. At 0.526 miles (0.847 km) in length, it is the shortest track in the NASCAR Cup Series. The track was also one of the first paved oval tracks in NASCAR, being built in 1947 by H. Clay Earles. It is also the only remaining race track that has been on the NASCAR circuit from its beginning in 1948.

Entry list 

 (R) denotes rookie driver.
 (i) denotes driver who is ineligible for series driver points.

Practice 
The only 30-minute practice session was held on Thursday, April 7, at 5:30 PM EST.

Qualifying 
Qualifying was held on Thursday, April 7, at 6:00 PM EST. Since Martinsville Speedway is a short track, the qualifying system used is a single-car, two-lap system with only one round. Whoever sets the fastest time in the round wins the pole.

Full qualifying results

Post race conflict 
After the race, Ty Gibbs and Sam Mayer got into a fistfight on pit road. On the last lap after getting passed by Brandon Jones, Gibbs was looking for a good finish when he got bumped by Sam Mayer and then Mayer shoved Gibbs up the racetrack in turn 4 after Mayer made contact with Landon Cassill. Mayer finished 5th while Gibbs finished 8th. After they took the checkered flag, Gibbs ran into Mayer's rear bumper a few times as a show of displeasure. On pit road, the two drivers got out of their cars and tried to talk with their helmets on. Gibbs then shoved Mayer as Mayer was taking his helmet off but Gibbs chose to keep his on. Upset with that, Mayer took Gibbs' visor and pushed it up as if he wants him to take his helmet off but Gibbs refused. After a shove by Mayer, Gibbs threw 3 punches at Mayer and the two got into a scuffle on pit road. Both drivers were eventually separated. Gibbs was eventually fined $15,000 for hitting Mayer's car after the race.

Race results 
Stage 1 Laps: 60

Stage 2 Laps: 60

Stage 3 Laps: 100

Standings after the race 

Drivers' Championship standings

Note: Only the first 12 positions are included for the driver standings.

References 

2022 NASCAR Xfinity Series
NASCAR races at Martinsville Speedway
Call 811 Before You Dig 250
Call 811 Before You Dig 250